HMS Colossus was a 74-gun third-rate ship of the line of the Royal Navy, launched from Deptford Dockyard on 23 April 1803. She was designed by Sir John Henslow as one of the large class 74s, and was the name ship of her class, the other being . As a large 74, she carried 24 pdrs on her upper gun deck, as opposed to the 18 pdrs found on the middling and common class 74s. She took part in the Battle of Trafalgar, and was broken up in 1826.

Napoleonic Wars
On 27 August 1803 Colossus recaptured the East Indiaman Lord Nelson, which the French privateer Belone had captured two weeks before and which  had fought to the point of surrender.

Trafalgar

Colossus fought at Trafalgar under Captain James Nicoll Morris, in Collingwood's lee column. After sustaining fire from the enemy fleet, she eventually ran by the French Swiftsure, 74, and became entangled with Argonaute, 74. Towards the end of the exchange of fire between the two ships, Captain Morris was hit by a shot from one of Argonaute's guns, just above the knee. Argonaute broke free from Colossus after this, whilst the British ship was engaging both Swiftsure and the Spanish Bahama, 74, on her other side. Bahama surrendered when Colossus brought down her main mast, and Swiftsure did likewise after combined fire from Colossus and  brought down her main and mizzen masts.

War of 1812

On 5 January 1813 Colossus, the frigate  and the brig  captured the American ship Dolphin. A little over a month later, on 11 February, Rhin and Colossus captured the American ship Print.

Fate
In 1815 Colossus was placed in ordinary at Chatham. She was  eventually broken up in 1826.

References
Citations

Bibliography

 Michael Phillips. Colossus (74) (1803). Michael Phillips' Ships of the Old Navy. Retrieved 4 November 2008.
 Lavery, Brian (2003) The Ship of the Line – Volume 1: The development of the battlefleet 1650–1850. Conway Maritime Press. .

External links 
 

1803 ships
Ships built in Deptford
Ships of the line of the Royal Navy